The Turning Of The Tide is an album by Irish singer Aoife Ní Fhearraigh.

Track listing
 Caledonia
 Both Sides Now
 After the Goldrush
 Danny Boy
 Maggie
 Turn Turn Turn
 Bonny Portmore
 Ready For the Storm
 Neidín
 If You Love Me
 Never Be the Sun
 An Cailín Rua
 At 17
 Mo Ghrá-sa Mo Dhia
 Fare Thee Well

Personnel 
 Aoife Ní Fhearraigh - vocals
 Ivan Gilliland - guitars
 Brendan Monaghan - pipes, whistles
 John Fitzpatrick - viola
 Neil Martin - cello
 Dave Cooke - backing vocals
 Seán Keane - vocals

2003 albums
Aoife Ní Fhearraigh albums